Clifford Samuel Britton (29 August 1909 – 1 December 1975) was an English football player and manager.

Playing career
After playing amateur football for a number of teams in the Bristol area, his professional playing career began when he signed for Bristol Rovers in 1928. He made over 50 appearances for Rovers, where he was a teammate of his brother Frank Britton. Britton was signed by Everton in 1930. At first he was deemed too frail and so he was playing in the reserves in the 1931–32 Championship season, but he was one of the stars of Everton's 1933 FA Cup win. He was one of the classiest playmakers of his era, who could produce miracles with short or long passes. Dixie Dean said that he was the best crosser of the ball that he played with. Dean joked that Britton's precision ensured that the laces on the ball were turned away when Dean had to head it. Britton made 242 appearances for Everton though only scoring three goals. Between 1934 and 1937 Britton also played nine times for England.

Management career

Burnley & Everton
After the war, Britton was made manager of Burnley in October 1945. He quickly steered Burnley to promotion from the Second Division in the 1946–47 season and to the 1947 FA Cup Final. He was appointed manager of Everton in 1948 and was regarded as a big improvement over the previous manager Theo Kelly.

Unlike his predecessor Britton was an ex-player and was said to have easy-going approachability so confidence improved. Britton was also a disciplinarian and it was said that his ideal team would be eleven 'teetotallers'. However the Everton squad was of low quality and suffered eleven consecutive defeats in September to November of the 1950–51 season. In a desperate foray into the transfer market, Britton spent £28,000 on an uninspiring inside forward, Harry Potts from Burnley when a new centre forward was desperately needed. (He could have brought Tommy Lawton back for less money). In 1950–51 Everton were two points clear of the relegation zone but contrived to suffer a 6–0 defeat to Sheffield Wednesday, while Chelsea beat Bolton Wanderers 4–0 and so Everton were relegated on goal average.

With remarkable patience the Everton board gave Britton a vote of confidence. However, in the summer of 1951, the board refused any more money for transfer fees and so Britton had to rely heavily on a policy of youth rather than on big money buys. Consequently, Everton spent three seasons in the Second Division finishing 7th and a worrying 16th before being promoted as runners-up in 1953–54.

The board continued to refuse transfer funds and Britton had disagreements with them. While Britton was abroad with the team the board wanted to appoint an acting manager. The board had also interfered with other decisions, but Britton had also made several mistakes such as dropping and then selling the talismanic Dave Hickson. Eventually Britton resigned from Everton in 1956 saying that "I want all managers to have the freedom to do the job for which they were appointed." A sub-committee of the board unsuccessfully ran the Everton team for the remainder of the season until Ian Buchan was appointed.

Preston North End
After a six-month gap Britton became manager of Preston North End. In the next five years, Preston North End flirted with winning the League championship and Britton laid the foundations of a solid youth policy. Britton took the decision that would cause Tom Finney to play some of the best football of his life. At the age of 34, Finney was made centre-forward, where he was also to play three games for England. Finney was a revelation, scoring 23 goals the 1956–57 season and Preston finished third in the First Division. The next season they went one better – runners-up to Champions Wolves. However Preston North End were relegated after the 1960–61 season and so Britton resigned.

Hull City
In 1961 he became manager of Hull City. Again he relied on youth rather than the transfer market until an injection of cash in 1964 allowed him to bring in new players such as Ken Wagstaff. Consequently, Hull eventually won the Third Division championship in the 1965–66 season. He continued to trust the same group of players instead of bringing in new talent and so Hull's challenge for promotion to the First Division faltered. He became general manager of Hull City in 1970 and was instrumental in the recruitment of Terry Neill as his successor.

Managerial statistics

All competitive league games (league and domestic cup) and international matches (including friendlies) are included.

References

Official Everton history site
Biography at Hull City site
Everton – School of Science by James Corbett Pan Books 2003 

1909 births
English footballers
England international footballers
England wartime international footballers
Hanham Athletic F.C. players
Roman Glass St George F.C. players
Bristol Rovers F.C. players
Everton F.C. players
Liverpool F.C. wartime guest players
Cardiff City F.C. wartime guest players
Aldershot F.C. wartime guest players
Doncaster Rovers F.C. wartime guest players
English football managers
Burnley F.C. managers
Everton F.C. managers
Preston North End F.C. managers
Hull City A.F.C. managers
1975 deaths
English Football League players
English Football League representative players
English Football League managers
Association football wing halves
FA Cup Final players